Tom Henning Hovi (born 15 January 1972 in Gjøvik) is a Norwegian former football who played as a left back in the club Vålerenga.

His former clubs are Skeid and Ham-Kam. He also had a short stay in Charlton Athletic in 1995.

He retired after the 2006 season.

Career as a football player
(Last updated on 3 May 2007)

References

External links
Guardian's Stats Centre

1972 births
Living people
Norwegian footballers
Hamarkameratene players
Charlton Athletic F.C. players
Skeid Fotball players
Vålerenga Fotball players
Eliteserien players
English Football League players
Norwegian First Division players
Expatriate footballers in England
Norwegian expatriate footballers
Sportspeople from Gjøvik

Association football defenders